Crocus boulosii  is a species of flowering plant in the genus Crocus of the family Iridaceae. It is a cormous perennial  native to Libya (Cyrenaica).

References

boulosii